WVEC (channel 13) is a television station licensed to Hampton, Virginia, United States, serving the Hampton Roads area as an affiliate of ABC. The station is owned by Tegna Inc., and maintains studios on Woodis Avenue in Norfolk; its transmitter is located in Suffolk, Virginia.

History

The station began operations on September 19, 1953, on UHF channel 15 as an NBC affiliate. It was signed on by Peninsula Broadcasting Corporation, co-owned by Hampton businessman Thomas P. Chisman and several other stockholders, along with WVEC radio (1490 AM, now WXTG; and 101.3 FM, now WWDE-FM). The station switched its affiliations to ABC in 1959, when WAVY-TV (channel 10) took the NBC affiliation two years after signing on. During the late 1950s, WVEC-TV was also briefly affiliated with the NTA Film Network.

In those days, UHF stations were not as successful as VHF stations, and the Federal Communications Commission (FCC) did not yet make requirements for television sets to have UHF tuners. So on November 13, 1959, WVEC-TV moved to its current location on VHF channel 13. Two years later, the channel 15 position would be occupied by current PBS member station WHRO-TV.

In 1980, Chisman sold the station to Corinthian Broadcasting, a unit of Dun & Bradstreet. At the time of the sale, it was the last locally owned and operated "Big Three" station in Hampton Roads. Four years later, Dun sold Corinthian to Belo, which owned the Dallas Morning News and WFAA-TV in its home city.

In 1997, WVEC (along with The Virginian-Pilot and Cox Communications) launched LNC4 (later LNC5), a 24-hour local cable news television channel, featuring repeats of WVEC newscasts and a live 10:00 p.m. newscast which began airing on WPEN-LP back in 1995. It was carried by Cox Communications on channel 5 within Hampton Roads. Pilot 13 News at 10 ceased production on January 30, 2009, however, the partnership with the Virginian-Pilot was expected to continue on a lesser level. LNC5 was closed on December 31, 2010.

On January 12, 2008, WVEC started producing local newscasts in digital widescreen 16x9. Though not truly high definition, the digital widescreen broadcasts were rescanned and up-converted from standard definition to 1080i before transmission to match the ratio of HD television screens. It remained the only major station in the Hampton Roads market to continue to air its newscasts in enhanced definition widescreen rather than true high definition until it upgraded to full HD in 2013.

On June 13, 2013, the Gannett Company announced that it would acquire Belo. The sale was completed on December 23. Later on in August 2014, Gannett announced it would split its broadcast and digital holdings into a new company, Tegna; the split became official on June 29, 2015. WVEC was retained by the latter company. After the acquisition, the station was standardized on air as 13 News Now though still using the ABC logo on screen.

In February 2018, the logo for WVEC was updated along with a new theme curated by Sixième Son entitled "C Clarity" used for the newscasts.

Branding and image

In the late 1980s, WVEC-TV introduced its most well-known promotional campaign, "The Spirit of Hampton Roads" – a campaign which has been customized and used by several other Belo Corporation stations (most notably the originator, WFAA-TV's "Spirit of Texas" campaign and the extremely successful "Spirit of Louisiana" from New Orleans' WWL-TV). The campaign was revamped in September 1992 with a new logo and song composed by Nashville-based 615 Music. WVEC originally dropped it in 1996 and replaced it with another slogan, "Working for You". "The Spirit of Hampton Roads" would finally return in 2003 on New Year's Eve. WVEC phased out the "Spirit" image for the second time in 2008.

News operation
In 1978, upon the resignation of news anchor Tony Burden, WVEC-TV hired ABC News correspondent Jim Kincaid as its main news anchor. Kincaid's signature became his "Jim's notes", short commentaries which ended the station's nightly newscasts. Compilations of these essays were published in several books authored by Kincaid, including Notes from Elam, referring to the small town in Prince Edward County, Virginia, where his farm was located. During the Vietnam War, Kincaid was a war correspondent for ABC. He returned to Vietnam in 1994 and reported from the same locations he had covered in the 1960s, producing an award-winning documentary and series of news stories. Kincaid retired from channel 13 in 1997; he died in July 2011.

Another well-known news anchor for WVEC-TV was Terry Zahn, who was hired from WAVY-TV in 1994. Zahn was very active with the American Cancer Society and helped establish the Relay for Life in the area. He produced two videos about Relay for Life which were distributed nationally, and served as chairman of the local Relay, which at the time was the largest in the U.S. Zahn was diagnosed with bone cancer in 1997, but remained with channel 13 until his death in January 2000. Each year, the American Cancer Society presents the Terry Zahn Award to a supporter of the Relay for Life. He was inducted into the National Relay Hall of Fame in 1999.

Hampton Roads TV news veteran Barbara Ciara began her career in the market at WVEC-TV, before joining WAVY-TV in 1983. Ciara rejoined channel 13 in 1989 and anchored evening newscasts for the station until defecting to rival CBS affiliate WTKR (channel 3) in 2000.

On March 7, 2003, former investigative reporter Craig Civale and former general assignment reporter Michelle Louie were engaged during a live segment of "Joe's Job" on 13News Daybreak. Louie was filling in for fellow reporter Joe Flanagan, when she was to visit a jewelry shop. During a live shot, out came Civale with ring in hand, where he proposes to Michelle. They both, at the time, had been dating for five years. They were married in September 2004.

In 2008, WVEC began broadcasting their newscast in digital widescreen, but because it was not completely high definition, it led rivals WAVY-TV, WVBT and WTKR to broadcast their news in high definition as opposed to WVEC's digital widescreen. It wouldn't be until August 17, 2013, when WVEC began broadcasting their news in high definition starting with the 6 p.m. newscast.

WVEC began using Gannett/Tegna's graphics and "This Is Home" package on July 24, 2014. The conversion happened during storms and debuted in "Storm Mode".

Notable former on-air staff
 Sharyn Alfonsi, reporter 1995–97; later with CBS News and 60 Minutes Sports
 Natasha Barrett, reporter from 2003 to 2006; later at KTRK-TV until 2018, now Strategic Communications Manager and Spokesperson for the City of Baytown, Texas
 Marcia Bartusiak, hired in 1971 as WVEC's first female reporter and later anchorwoman. Leaving in 1975, she moved into the field of science writing. The author of seven books, she is now Professor of the Practice Emeritus at MIT.
 Simeon Coxe, reporter specializing in off-beat stories in the 1970s and 1980s. Lead singer for the 1960s and 1990s Silver Apples.
 Jim Kincaid, hired from ABC News in 1978, served as anchor from 1978 to 1996, retired in 1997. (deceased)
 John Miller, news anchor and news director in the 1970s and 1980s, morning and noon anchor in the 1990s. Elected Virginia state senator in November 2007 until his death in April 2016
 Hank Plante, Emmy and Peabody Award-winning broadcaster, now retired in Palm Springs, California
 Robyne Robinson, former Military Affairs reporter. Later with KMSP-TV in Minneapolis until 2010. Retired from broadcasting to become Democratic-Farmer-Labor Party lieutenant gubernatorial candidate in the 2010 Minnesota DFL Gubernatorial primary.
 Stan Verrett, now an anchor at ESPN and ESPNEWS, also worked for rival WAVY.
 Terry Zahn, hired from WAVY in 1994, served as anchor until death from bone cancer in January 2000.
 Regina Mobley, hired by WVEC in 1995 and transferred to WAVY-TV in January 2021.

Technical information

Subchannels
The station's digital signal is multiplexed:

On November 8, 2010, WVEC added ABC's Live Well Network (now Localish) on channel 13.2. On January 23, 2013, WVEC added MeTV to a new subchannel, 13.3. On January 20, 2015, WVEC removed Live Well Network and replaced it with the Justice Network (now True Crime Network).

Analog-to-digital conversion
WVEC discontinued regular programming on its analog signal, over VHF channel 13, on June 12, 2009, as part of the federally mandated transition from analog to digital television. The station's digital signal relocated from its pre-transition UHF channel 41 to VHF channel 13.

Eastern Shore translator
There is one low-powered translator of WVEC that is located in the Eastern Shore of Virginia and is municipally-owned by Accomack County rather than Tegna. WVEC and Tegna do not own or operate any translators in the Greater Hampton Roads area.
 W18EG-D  Channel 18.2 Onancock

See also
 LNC 5, a defunct local news channel.

References

External links
 

VEC
ABC network affiliates
True Crime Network affiliates
MeTV affiliates
Quest (American TV network) affiliates
Twist (TV network) affiliates
This TV affiliates
Heroes & Icons affiliates
Tegna Inc.
Television channels and stations established in 1953
1953 establishments in Virginia
Former Gannett subsidiaries
Hampton, Virginia